David Blue (born Stuart David Cohen; February 18, 1941 – December 2, 1982) was an American folk music singer-songwriter and actor.

History
The son of a Jewish father and Irish Roman Catholic French Canadian descent mother, David Blue quit high school at age 17, left home, and joined the Navy, but was soon thrown out for his "Inability to adjust to a military way of life."

Blue became an integral part of the Greenwich Village folk music scene in New York City, which included Bob Dylan, Phil Ochs, Dave Van Ronk, Tom Paxton, Bob Neuwirth, and Eric Andersen. Blue is best known for writing the song "Outlaw Man" for the Eagles, which was included on their 1973 Desperado album. Blue's original version of "Outlaw Man" was the lead track of his own Nice Baby and the Angel album, re-issued on CD, with the entire David Blue catalogue, in 2007 on Wounded Bird Records.

Blue joined Dylan's Rolling Thunder Revue in 1975 and appeared in Renaldo and Clara, the 1978 movie that was filmed during that tour. Blue acted in other films including, The American Friend (1977), directed by Wim Wenders, The Ordeal of Patty Hearst (a 1979 TV movie) and Human Highway (1982) by Neil Young. Human Highway premiered in 1983 after Blue's death. Blue also performed onstage in Stephen Poliakoff's play American Days at Manhattan Theatre Club in New York City, in December 1980, directed by Jacques Levy.

Blue died of a heart attack in December 1982 at the age of 41, while jogging in Washington Square Park in New York City.

Discography
 Singer Songwriter Project (Elektra, 1965) (Blue, who is credited as David Cohen, contributes three tracks and is one of four artists; the others are Richard Fariña, Patrick Sky and Bruce Murdoch)
 David Blue (Elektra, 1966)
 These 23 Days in September (Reprise, 1968)
 Me (Reprise, 1970) (released under the name S. David Cohen)
 Stories (Asylum, 1972)
 Nice Baby and the Angel, (Asylum, 1973)
 Com'n Back for More (Asylum, 1975)
 Cupid's Arrow (Asylum, 1976)

Filmography

References

External links
 Further information about David Blue
 
 Liner notes to Blue's first album
 David Blue MySpace page

1941 births
1982 deaths
Musicians from Providence, Rhode Island
American folk singers
American male singer-songwriters
People from Greenwich Village
Elektra Records artists
20th-century American singers
American male actors
American folk guitarists
American acoustic guitarists
American male guitarists
20th-century American guitarists
Songwriters from Rhode Island
Guitarists from Rhode Island
American people of French-Canadian descent
American people of Jewish descent
American people of Irish descent
20th-century American male singers
Singer-songwriters from New York (state)